The women's individual recurve competition at the 2015 European Games was held from 16 to 19 June 2015 at the Tofiq Bahramov Stadium in Baku, Azerbaijan. One of five events comprising the inaugural European Games' archery programme, it featured a total of 62 archers from 30 different nations.

Karina Winter of Germany won the gold medal, defeating the reigning world champion Maja Jager of Denmark in the final. Spain's Alicia Marín won the bronze medal ahead of Greece's Evangelia Psarra.

Background

Qualification

Qualification for the European Games took place at the European Archery Championships in Echmiadzin, Armenia in July 2014 and at a final qualifying tournament held during the European Grand Prix in Marathon, Greece in March 2015. As the host nation, Azerbaijan automatically qualified a maximum three female archers for the Games. The quota place won by Kosovo marked their first appearance as an independent entity in the women's individual event, having been accepted as a full member of the International Olympic Committee at the end of 2014.

Format

Schedule

Report

The Azerbaijani team was forced to make a late change after injury forced Sugrakhanim Mugabilzada to pull out of the Games. 41-year-old Leila Fazilova was initially announced as her replacement, but Reuters reported on 13 June she had voluntarily decided to withdraw amid claims of nepotism, her husband holding the position of assistant team coach of the Azerbaijani squad. Yaylagul Ramazanova was subsequently called up as the team's third member just three days before the beginning of the competition.

On 18 June, the day before the beginning of the elimination rounds, the Dutch Olympic Committee announced that Shireen-Zoë de Vries was to return to the Netherlands due to from illness and would take no further part in the competition. The following day Kosovoan archer Lirije Sahiti also withdrew from the opening elimination round after falling ill. Their respective opponents Miriam Alarcon and Natalia Valeeva were thereby given a bye to the second round.

Sartori and Tonetta, who had already won gold medals in the women's team event, each progressed to the 1/8 elimination round to face German opposition, with Sartori meeting Richter and Tonetta facing top seed Unruh. Valeeva, the third member of the victorious Italian women's team and the winner of the gold medal in the mixed team event, did not progress beyond the 1/16 elimination round, losing to Yuliya Lobzhenidze of Georgia in four sets.

Results

Ranking round
Key
 Advanced to 1/16 elimination round 
 Advanced to 1/32 elimination round

Elimination rounds

Section 1

Section 2

Section 3

Section 4

Note: An asterisk (*) denotes a win from a one-arrow shoot-off 
Source:

Finals

Source:

See also
Archery at the 2014 Asian Games – Women's individual recurve
Archery at the 2015 Pan American Games – Women's individual
Archery at the 2016 Summer Olympics – Women's individual

References

Women's individual
2015 in women's archery